Araden was a town and polis (city-state) of ancient Crete. Stephanus of Byzantium claims was Araden later name of, rather than a successor settlement to, Anopolis (Ἀνώπολις)

Its site is located near modern Aradena.

References

Populated places in ancient Crete
Former populated places in Greece
Cretan city-states